National Unity, Freedom & Development (Malagasy: Firaisam-pirenena , Fahalalahana sy ny Fampandrosoana; abbreviated FFF) is a political party in Madagascar, led by Andriamparany Benjamin Radavidson. In the 2013 general election, the party won 2 seats.

References 

Political parties in Madagascar